Diamond Harbour may refer to:

Diamond Harbour, a city of South 24 Parganas district, West Bengal, India. Its near Kolkata.
Diamond Harbour subdivision, a subdivision of South 24 Parganas district, West Bengal, India
Diamond Harbour (Lok Sabha constituency) - a parliamentary constituency centred on Diamond Harbour city, West Bengal, India
Diamond Harbour (Vidhan Sabha constituency)
Diamond Harbour I (community development block)
Diamond Harbour II (community development block)
Diamond Harbour, New Zealand, a village in Canterbury, New Zealand